Rateče is a village in the Municipality of Kranjska Gora, in the far northwest corner of Slovenia. It is located in the upper part of the Upper Sava Valley, between the Sava Dolinka and Ziljica rivers, a tributary of the Drava. Further up the valley is the Rateče border crossing to Italy. Rateče is the closest Slovenian village to the summit of Mount Peč (also known in Slovene as Tromeja 'tripoint'), the point where the borders of Austria, Italy, and Slovenia meet.

History
The settlement was first mentioned in 1385. It still retains much of its historic character. One of the oldest surviving churches in Slovenia, the Church of St. Thomas, is located in the village. The Rateče (or Klagenfurt) Manuscript, one of the earliest surviving Slovene texts, is thought to have been compiled in the Rateče area (possibly at St. Thomas') during the second half of the 14th century. The cadastral community of Rateče was split into two parts by the new Italian-Yugoslav border after the treaties that followed the First World War; Yugoslavia acquired the eastern portion, which includes the main settlement of Rateče, and Italy the western mountainous portion, which is still part of the municipality of Tarvisio.

Other historic buildings include the late Gothic parish church dedicated to the Holy Spirit and an ethnographic museum in the Kajžnk House, a restored 19th-century farmhouse.

Geography
Trebiža and Kravnjak creeks flow through the village. Their sources are on the slopes of Mount Peč (1,510 m) and Mount Petelinjek (1,552 m), constituting the extreme western part of the Karawanks range. Below the village and beside the main road from Jesenice to Tarvisio is the gravelly Ledine Basin, where Nadiža Creek disappears underground. The creek flows from the glacial Planica Valley. At times of heavy precipitation a small lake forms in Ledine, from which water filters through the gravel to rise again at Zelenci, a marshy wetland with an extraordinarily rich ecosystem, regarded as the permanent source of the Sava Dolinka River.

Economy and tourism
The village is surrounded by fields, meadows, and pastures. Due to the harsh climate, the inhabitants concern themselves principally with livestock husbandry, relying on summer grazing in high pastures. Most local farmers are binational landowners, with meadows across the border in Italy.

Tourism is important to the local economy; there are many vacation houses in the area. Rateče is a starting point for hiking trips into the Julian Alps (through Tamar) and the Karawanks range. The lower Planica Valley hosts well-known ski-jumping competitions, where both the 100 m and 200 m benchmarks were first broken (in 1936 and 1994, respectively).
Near the border crossing is the Macesnov'c ski area, with a 1,900 m track.

Every year there is a local event organised by the Rateče Tourist Association. It takes place on 15 August in the village square (in Gorica).

References

External links

Rateče on Geopedia
Tourist Society Rateče - Planica
 Climate characteristics, meteorological station Rateče - Planica

Populated places in the Municipality of Kranjska Gora